Shaktyavesh Avatar (Devanagari: ,) is a type of incarnation, Avatar of God as per Hinduism.  "Whenever the Lord is present in someone by portions of His various potencies, the living entity representing the Lord is called a śaktyāveśa-avatāra — that is, an incarnation invested with special power."
Unlike other avatars which are expansions (amsas) or expansions of expansions (amsaamsa) of the Lord Himself, a Shaktyavesha avatar is when the Lord empowers a living entity (jiva) with the potency of God Himself.

Shakti means Power; Avesha means endowed; Avatar means one who descends from the spiritual realm, incarnation. So a Sakthiavesha avatar means a Spiritual person who is empowered (temporarily) by the God to do a specific task. Parasurama Avatar of Lord Vishnu is one of the most famous Sakthiavesha Avatar. He was specifically empowered to destroy rogues, demons and evils. He was empowered by the "duṣṭa-damana-śakti" - the power to destroy great evils of Lord Vishnu. Sakthiavesha Avatar usually happens when the world, especially nature (Prakriti) or righteousness (Dharmma) is in great peril due to the menace of large number of relatively less powerful demonic entity's, be it human or non-human. When extremely powerful evil wreak havoc on world, God himself will appear or appear in his Purna Avatar form to crush it.

The following description of the various types of avatars is given in the ancient Garga Samhita.

It is stated in the Śrī Caitanya Caritāmṛta Madhya 20.246

and also in that same chapter it is stated:

See also

 List of founders of religious traditions

References 

Avatars
Hinduism articles needing expert attention
Vaishnavism